"The Pie" is the 79th episode of the NBC sitcom Seinfeld. This was the 15th episode for the fifth season. It aired on February 17, 1994. The episode's main running theme is characters adamantly refusing to eat certain foods served to them without giving an explanation. A store mannequin that looks just like Elaine is also a focus in multiple plot threads of the episode.

Plot
Jerry is miffed after his girlfriend Audrey refuses to try a bite of his apple pie without telling him why. She just shakes her head from side to side. In a clothing store, Kramer sees a mannequin that looks just like Elaine. Elaine and George visit the store. Elaine demands to know the source of the mannequin, but the condescending saleswoman refuses to tell her. George becomes interested in an expensive suit that will soon be on sale at half price. Seeing another customer interested in the suit, George hides it so the other customer will not find it on the sale day. After George buys the suit, the other customer swears vengeance.

Jerry and Audrey go to eat at Poppie's, her father's restaurant. In the bathroom, Jerry notices that Poppie did not wash his hands after using the toilet. After seeing Poppie kneading the pizza dough with his unwashed hands, Jerry refuses to eat the pizza in the same manner that Audrey rejected the pie by shaking his head from side to side. She interprets it as him taking revenge.

Elaine returns to the clothing store where she finds the "Elaine" mannequin posed bent over, with another mannequin spanking it. Elaine is so furious that she steals the mannequin and runs off. However, the "Elaine" mannequin is a big success and appears in stores across the nation. It is designed by Ricky, the obsessive television enthusiast she encountered in "The Cigar Store Indian."

George becomes concerned by a swooshing noise the suit makes when he walks, as he is on his way to a job interview. George's prospective employer takes him to dinner. When George notices his rival for the suit surreptitiously watching him from the kitchen, he fears the food has been tampered with. He refuses to taste the dessert in the same manner Audrey and Jerry refused their food. For this he does not get the job, but he nonetheless considers it a wise decision, since everyone who ate the tainted dessert became violently ill.

When Jerry finds out that Audrey has since eaten a whole slice of apple pie at the same restaurant where she refused it before, he furiously goes to Poppie's restaurant to tell her off. While he is there, a health inspector arrives and shuts down the restaurant, giving Jerry the opportunity to gloat.

Kramer suffers from a bad itch that is only relieved at the hands of Olive, a cashier from Monk's who has long fingernails. Kramer's itch heals and he plans to break up with Olive. He tells her that the mannequin (which is outside in Jerry's car) is his new girlfriend and goes out to the car to zestfully make out with it while Olive watches in dismay.

Production
Though the cast reading took place on January 13, 1994, Julia Louis-Dreyfus' birthday, the filming of this episode did not take place until February due to the 1994 Northridge earthquake. Though the show's production staff considered moving from CBS Studio Center to Paramount Studios, CBS's stage crew spent three weeks renovating the stage before it was put back into use as CBS considered Seinfeld one of its best tenants. As an additional incentive to come back, CBS planned on renovating its New York Street backlot, which did not see its appearance until season six.

Tom Gammill once witnessed a chef leave a restaurant restroom without washing his hands after using the toilet, providing the basis for Poppie's story. Gammill and his writing partner Max Pross named Poppie as a setup for the climactic joke, "Poppie's hands are poopy," which was ultimately replaced with "Poppie is a bit sloppy." The incident with the pie was based on a real-life incident as told to the writers by Seinfeld himself. They were struck by how the normally easygoing Seinfeld was so upset over such a trivial incident.

The character Olive was based on a cashier at the House of Pies.

References

External links 
 

Seinfeld (season 5) episodes
1994 American television episodes